InsWeb Corporation formerly operated an online insurance marketplace designed to allow consumers to compare insurance products and rate quotes from a variety of providers. InsWeb does not provide insurance directly. The company connects consumers with multiple providers via a proprietary online technology platform. Customers receive price quotes for the various insurance products they choose and are contacted by outside insurance agents and/or companies to continue the purchasing process. In conjunction with the consumer-facing insurance quote system, they also operate a lead generating site as a marketing source for insurance agents.

History
InsWeb was founded in 1995 by Hussein A. Enan and Darrell Ticehurst and became a publicly traded company in 1999. As of its IPO date it was the exclusive provider of auto insurance quotes on the Yahoo! internet portal. InsWeb created the second online insurance marketplace. InsWeb.com was the second website that allowed a user to receive multiple insurance quotes from multiple providers by filling out a single form. In the 4th quarter of 2010, InsWeb acquired Protreo Media Corporation.

In 2011, the primary business was sold to Bankrate. The unpurchased assets became the Internet Patents Corp which then changed its name to Prism Technologies.

Awards and recognitions
InsWeb has been recognized by several prominent publications since its founding including:

Kiplinger (2009) "Best Auto Insurance Website"
Kiplinger (2008) "Best Auto Insurance Website"
Kiplinger (2007) "Best Auto Insurance Website"
Forbes (2007) "Best of the Web" and "Forbes' Favorite"

References

Financial services companies established in 1995
Companies based in Sacramento County, California
Insurance companies of the United States
Online insurance companies
Companies formerly listed on the Nasdaq
Bankrate